The 9th Dalmatia Division (Serbo-Croatian Latin: Deveta dalmatinska divizija) was a Yugoslav Partisan division formed in Imotski on 13 February 1943. Upon formation it was composed of the 3rd, the 4th and the 5th Dalmatia Brigades. The division fought NDH, Germany, Italy and Chetniks in various operations conducted by the Partisans, it played a key role in the Trieste operation. It was commanded by Ante Banina and its political commissar was Eduard Santini.

References 

Divisions of the Yugoslav Partisans
Military units and formations established in 1943